Charles Curnow (born 3 February 1997) is a professional Australian rules footballer playing for the Carlton Football Club in the Australian Football League (AFL). Curnow received a nomination for the 2017 AFL Rising Star award in round 16 of the 2017 season and won the Coleman Medal for kicking the most goals in the 2022 AFL season.

Early life
Curnow played his state level under-18s football for the Geelong Falcons in the TAC Cup. He became recognised as a strong key forward with elite endurance. He was considered a top draft prospect, with some risk due to a knee injury which saw him miss a large part of his final year of under-18s football. Charlie's older brother, Ed Curnow, also plays at Carlton.

AFL career
Carlton selected Curnow with their third pick, number twelve overall, in the 2015 AFL draft. He made his AFL debut in round 2 of the 2016 season against  at Docklands Stadium. He recorded 11 disposals, 4 marks, and kicked his first goal in the fourth quarter.

In September 2017, he placed fourth overall in the AFL Rising Star award, with a total of 27 points.

In June 2018, Curnow signed a four-year contract extension with Carlton, committing his future to the club until 2023. He finished the 2018 season with an equal-third finish in the John Nicholls Medal, and was the club's leading goalkicker with 34 goals.

In Round 13, 2019, Curnow kicked a career-high seven goals in round 13 against the Western Bulldogs at Marvel Stadium. However, he suffered a medial ligament injury in his right knee in the following match – a recurrence of injuries he had suffered on that knee as a junior player – and a slew of subsequent injuries to that knee, including a dislocation and a fractured kneecap in the 2020 preseason, and another recurrence in the 2021 preseason, has meant that Curnow did not play another senior game until Round 20, 2021.

Curnow played every game of the 2022 AFL season and won the 2022 Coleman Medal kicking 64 goals. Following his teammate Harry McKay's Coleman medal win in 2021, the pair became the first teammates to kick the most goals in the league in consecutive seasons in 121 years. 

On August 19, 2022 it was announced that Curnow signed a 6-year contract to remain at Carlton until 2029.

Statistics
Updated to the end of 2022.

|-
| scope="row" text-align:center | 2016
| 
| 30 || 6 || 5 || 2 || 35 || 25 || 60 || 18 || 9 || 0.8 || 0.3 || 5.8 || 4.2 || 10.0 || 3.0 || 1.5 || 0
|-
| scope="row" text-align:center | 2017
|  
| 30 || 21 || 20 || 12 || 207 || 90 || 297 || 119 || 61 || 1.0 || 0.6 || 9.9 || 4.3 || 14.1 || 5.7 || 2.9 || 0
|-
| scope="row" text-align:center | 2018
| 
| 30 || 20 || 34 || 20 || 206 || 71 || 277 || 123 || 42 || 1.7 || 1.0 || 10.3 || 3.6 || 13.9 || 6.2 || 2.1 || 3
|-
| scope="row" text-align:center | 2019
|  
| 30 || 11 || 18 || 8 || 115 || 20 || 135 || 49 || 17 || 1.6 || 0.7 || 10.5 || 1.8 || 12.2 || 4.5 || 1.6 || 3
|-
| scope="row" text-align:center | 2020
| 
| 30 || 0 || – || – || – || – || – || – || – || – || – || – || – || – || – || – || –
|-
| scope="row" text-align:center | 2021
|  
| 30 || 4 || 2 || 5 || 35 || 14 || 49 || 16 || 6 || 0.5 || 1.3 || 8.8 || 3.5 || 12.3 || 4.0 || 1.5 || 0
|-
| scope="row" text-align:center | 2022
| 
| 30 || 22 || 64 || 42 || 231 || 33 || 264 || 126 || 35 || 2.9 || 1.9 || 10.5 || 1.5 || 12.0 || 5.7 || 1.6 || 
|- style="background:#EAEAEA; font-weight:bold; width:2em"
| scope="row" text-align:center class="sortbottom" colspan=3 | Career
| 84
| 143
| 89
| 829
| 253
| 1082
| 451
| 170
| 1.7
| 1.1
| 9.9
| 3.0
| 12.9
| 5.4
| 2.0
| 6
|}

Honours and achievements
Individual
 All-Australian team: 2022
 2× 22under22 team: 2017, 2018
 AFL Rising Star nominee: 2017
 Coleman Medal: 2022

References

External links

Australian rules footballers from Victoria (Australia)
Carlton Football Club players
1997 births
Living people
Geelong Falcons players
Preston Football Club (VFA) players
People educated at Geelong College
Coleman Medal winners